Watters is an unincorporated community located in Forward Township, Butler County, Pennsylvania, United States.

Notes

Unincorporated communities in Butler County, Pennsylvania
Unincorporated communities in Pennsylvania